General Juan Madariaga is a town in Buenos Aires Province, Argentina. It is the administrative centre for General Madariaga Partido.

The settlement was established on December 8, 1907.

External links

 Municipal website

Populated places in Buenos Aires Province
Populated places established in 1907